Laila Soufyane (born 4 August 1983) is a born Moroccan Italian female long-distance runner, who won two Italian championships.

National titles
 Italian Athletics Championships
 10 km road: 2014
 Half marathon: 2015

See also
 Naturalized athletes of Italy

References

External links
 

1983 births
Living people
Italian female long-distance runners
Moroccan emigrants to Italy
Naturalised citizens of Italy
Italian sportspeople of African descent
Italian female marathon runners
Athletics competitors of Gruppo Sportivo Esercito